The men's discus throw event at the 1994 World Junior Championships in Athletics was held in Lisbon, Portugal, at Estádio Universitário de Lisboa on 20 and 21 July.  A 2 kg (senior implement) discus was used.

Medalists

Results

Final
21 July

Qualifications
20 Jul

Group A

Group B

Participation
According to an unofficial count, 24 athletes from 19 countries participated in the event.

References

Discus throw
Discus throw at the World Athletics U20 Championships